TGBA01AD (also known as FKB01MD) is a serotonin reuptake inhibitor, 5-HT1A and 5-HT1D receptor agonist, and 5-HT2 receptor antagonist which is under development by Fabre-Kramer for the treatment of major depressive disorder. It has been in phase II clinical trials since 2009, and as of January 2016, remains in this phase of development.

See also 
 List of investigational antidepressants

References 

5-HT1A agonists
5-HT1D agonists
5-HT2 antagonists
Antidepressants
Drugs with undisclosed chemical structures
Serotonin reuptake inhibitors